Marko Sopi (1938-2006) was an Albanian prelate of the Roman Catholic Church.

Biography
Marko Sopi was born on in Binač, Vitina, Kingdom of Yugoslavia (modern Kosovo) on February 6, 1938. From 1995 to 2006 he was the titular bishop of Celerina. From 1995 to 2000 he served as Apostolic Administrator of the Roman Catholic Diocese of Skopje in Macedonia, while from 2000 until his death in 2006 he was the Apostolic Administrator of the Roman Catholic Apostolic Administration of Prizren. After his death, bishop Dodë Gjergji succeeded him as new Apostolic Administrator of Prizren.

Notes

References

External links
 Catholic Hierarchy: Bishop Marko Sopi
 Catholic Hierarchy: Celerina (Titular See)
 Catholic Hierarchy: Apostolic Administration of Prizren
 GCatholic.org: Apostolic Administration of Prizren

1938 births
2006 deaths
20th-century Albanian clergy
21st-century Albanian clergy
21st-century Roman Catholic bishops in North Macedonia
Albanian Roman Catholic bishops
Kosovo Albanians
People from Viti, Kosovo
20th-century Roman Catholic bishops in North Macedonia
Bishops of Skopje